Nioro is the name of two towns in West Africa
Nioro du Sahel, a town in the Kayes Region of western Mali
Nioro du Rip, a town in the southern Kaolack Region, Nioro du Rip Department, of Senegal

Places 
 Nioro Tougouné Rangabé
 Nioro Airport

Names 
 Nioro Cercle, an administrative subdivision of the Kayes Region of Mali (chef-lieu)
 Nioro Tougouné Rangabé